Interferon alpha-14 is a protein that in humans is encoded by the IFNA14 gene.

References

Further reading